Andrew David Bird (born 17 March 1967) is a former New Zealand rowing cox who won an Olympic bronze medal at the 1988 Summer Olympics in Seoul.

Bird was born in Greymouth, New Zealand, in 1967. He won bronze in the coxed four along with George Keys, Greg Johnston, Ian Wright and Chris White. In 1986 Bird won silver medals in the coxed four at both the Commonwealth Games in Edinburgh and the World Rowing Championships in Nottingham. In 1987 he coxed the men's eight at the World Championships in Denmark.

He lives in Wellington where he is the principal of Kelburn Normal primary school. His daughter, Lucy Bird, won gold as a coxswain for the women's premier eight at the 2016 New Zealand rowing nationals.

References

External links 
 
 
 
 

1967 births
Living people
New Zealand male rowers
Coxswains (rowing)
Olympic rowers of New Zealand
Olympic bronze medalists for New Zealand
Rowers at the 1988 Summer Olympics
Commonwealth Games silver medallists for New Zealand
Rowers at the 1986 Commonwealth Games
Olympic medalists in rowing
Sportspeople from Greymouth
People educated at St Andrew's College, Christchurch
World Rowing Championships medalists for New Zealand
Medalists at the 1988 Summer Olympics
Commonwealth Games medallists in rowing
Medallists at the 1986 Commonwealth Games